Flavobacterium aquidurense  is a Gram-negative and chemoheterotrophic bacterium from the genus of Flavobacterium which has been isolated from water from the Westhöfer Bach in Germany.

References

 

aquidurense
Bacteria described in 2007